Fridtjof Rasin Røinås (born 2 August 1994) is a Norwegian former racing cyclist. He competed in the men's team time trial event at the 2017 UCI Road World Championships.

Major results
2012
 1st  Road race, National Junior Road Championships
2013
 4th Himmerland Rundt
2015
 1st Stage 3 East Bohemia Tour
2016
 5th Overall Tour du Loir-et-Cher
1st Stage 3
2017
 10th Overall Baltic Chain Tour
2018
 10th Omloop van het Houtland
2019
 1st  Mountains classification, Danmark Rundt
 8th Himmerland Rundt
2020
 4th International Rhodes Grand Prix
 5th Overall International Tour of Rhodes

References

External links
 

1994 births
Living people
Norwegian male cyclists
People from Grimstad
Sportspeople from Agder